Zeynalu (also Romanized as Zeynālū; also known as Zeynānlū) is a village in Rowzeh Chay Rural District, in the Central District of Urmia County, West Azerbaijan Province, Iran. At the 2006 census, its population was 577, in 153 families.

References 

Populated places in Urmia County